The Catch of the Season is an Edwardian musical comedy by Seymour Hicks and Cosmo Hamilton, with music by Herbert Haines and Evelyn Baker and lyrics by Charles H. Taylor, based on the fairy tale Cinderella. A debutante is engaged to a young aristocrat but loves a page.

The musical premiered at the Vaudeville Theatre in London in 1904 and ran for 621 performances. It starred Hicks, Zena Dare and Camille Clifford. Replacements included Louie Pounds. The New York production, in 1905, starred Edna May, at Daly's Theatre. The show was produced internationally and was revived until the First World War.

Synopsis 

Lady Caterham's stepdaughter Angela, who is a debutante about to 'come out' and is 'the catch of the season'.  She becomes engaged to the young rake, Lord St. Jermyns, although she really loves the page, Bucket. Honoria Bedford, Lady Crystal's younger daughter, who is about to 'come out', has taken up smoking, which in 1904 was considered shocking.

Productions 
The Catch of the Season was produced by Agostino and Stefano Gatti and American Charles Frohman at the Vaudeville Theatre in London, opening on 9 September 1904 and running for a very successful 621 performances.  The production starred Zena Dare as Angela, because Hicks' wife Ellaline Terriss was pregnant.  Later Terriss played the role for a time, ceding it to Dare's sister, Phyllis Dare.  It also starred Hicks and Louie Pounds.  Belgian-American actress Camille Clifford, who played Sylvia Gibson, became perhaps the most famous "Gibson Girl".

Frohman produced the musical on both sides of the Atlantic, and one year after the premiere, with the London production still running, he exported The Catch of the Season to Daly's Theatre in New York, where Edna May starred with an English supporting cast and a chorus of English and French "Gibson Girls".  The score was supplemented with numerous interpolations, principally by American music director William T. Francis and also by Jerome Kern.

Other international productions followed.  In Budapest The Catch of the Season was translated as A bálkirálynő by Jenő Heltai in 1907. The Australian premiere was at Her Majesty's Theatre, Sydney in 1909. In Vienna Die Ballkönigin, translated by Fritz Lunzer and actor Karl Tuschl, was mounted twice in 1913, first at the Sommertheater Venedig in Wien, then as a holiday entertainment at the Theater an der Wien.  London revivals included a 1917 production at the Prince's Theatre.

Roles and original cast
Angela Crystal – Zena Dare (replaced by Ellaline Terriss and later Phyllis Dare)
Duke of St. Jermyns – Seymour Hicks
Higham Montague – Stanley Brett
William Gibson – Compton Coutts 
Sir John Crystal – Charles Daly 
Lady Crystal – Mollie Lowell
Lady Caterham – Rosina Filippi 
Almeric Montpelier – Philip Desborough
Lord Dundreary – Sam Sothern
Captain Rushpool – Mervyn Dene 
Lord Yatton – Cecil Kinnaird
Miss Caw – Barbara Deane 
Hon. Sophia Bedford – Ethel Matthews (Louie Pounds later played the role)
Duchess of St. Jermyns – Ruby Ray
Enid Gibson – Kate Vesey
Princess Schowenhohen-Hohenschowen – Lily Maynier 
Clotilde – Helene Blanche
Bucket – Master A. Valchera 
Honoria Crystal – Hilda Jacobsen 
Sylvia Gibson – Camille Clifford
Footmen, Guests, Gibson Girls, Bridesmaids

Musical numbers

Broadway score (music by Haines and Baker and lyrics by Taylor, except as noted):
Act I    
Tea and tittle tattle – Lady Crystal, Lord Yatton, Almeric Montpelier, Footmen and Chorus 
We've become the great attraction – Gibson Girls 
(It's) All Done by Kindness (Music by William T. Francis) – Mr. William Gibson 
I'll Be a Good Little Girl – Angela 
If I Were King of Babylon – Bucket 
(My Little) Buttercup (Music by Luke Forwood) – Angela 
Fairy attendants! – Clotilde, Angela, Lady Caterham and Assistants 
       
Act II   
Every year there's somebody – Chorus 
Sylvia the Gibson Girl (Lyrics by Frank Compton, music by Hugh Rumbold) – Gibson Girls 
Seaweed (Music and Lyrics by Fred Earle) – Mr. William Gibson 
Hail! Miss O'Halloran – Chorus 
Molly O'Halloran (Music and Lyrics by Jerome Kern) – Angela 
A Little Bit of Dinner (with a Friend) (Music by William T. Francis) – Lord Yatton 
Suppose – Angela and The Duke of St. Jermyns 
Auf Wiedersehn (Lyrics by Vernon Roy, music by William T. Francis) – Talleur Andrews 
The Church Parade – The Duke of St. Jermyns 
Back to Harrow (Lyrics by J. J. Montague, music by William T. Francis) – Mr. William Gibson and Lord Yatton 
Rainbow (Lyrics by Fred W. Leigh, music by Henry E. Pether) – Angela 
Rosy Petals We Will Shower (Music by William T. Francis)       
Cinderella! You Have Won! (Music by William T. Francis) – Angela

The Broadway score cut the following songs by Haines, Baker and Taylor (except as noted) that had been included in the British production:
"Raining" 
"Won't You Kiss Me Once Before You Do?" (by Kern and Harris)
"Cupid is the Captain of the Army" (by Dave Reed Jr.)
"Around the World (by Cass Freeborn and Grant Stewart)
"Cigarette" 
"The Charms on My Chain"

References

External links
Cast lists and other information
List of longest running plays in London and New York

The Catch of the Season MIDI files
Information from a Zena Dare biography
Information about 1908 benefit performances

1904 musicals
West End musicals
Musicals based on secular traditions
British musicals